Boos, known in Japan as  are fictional ghosts from the Mario and Yoshi series of video games. They first appeared as a common enemy in 1988's Super Mario Bros. 3, in which they were called Boo Diddleys (a reference to the American blues singer Bo Diddley). Since then, they have been a mainstay in the Mario series, usually appearing as enemies, but occasionally appearing as playable characters in the Mario spin-off games, or even as allies of Mario. They also have prominent roles in Luigi's Mansion, Luigi's Mansion: Dark Moon and Luigi's Mansion 3. They are named after the sound that one might make when trying to frighten someone ("boo!"), whereas their Japanese name comes from the verb , meaning 'to be shy'.

A Boo's most common pattern of attack is to sneak up on the player (usually Mario) from behind while they are facing away from them; however, they stop their attack and hide behind their arms if looked at. Being ghosts, they are usually invincible, and unable to be defeated without certain items or conditions.

It has been implied that Boos may have been other living species before they became Boos, but this has not been made clear. There are also sub-species of Boo based on other species; for example undead Shy Guys become "Boo Guys" while undead Lakitus become "Fishin' Boo"s.

Concept and creation

In an interview with Nintendo Power magazine, Mario franchise creator Shigeru Miyamoto stated that while working on Super Mario Bros. 3, co-designer Takashi Tezuka had the idea of putting his wife in the game. According to Miyamoto, "(Tezuka's) wife is very quiet normally, but one day she exploded, maddened by all the time he spent at work. In the game, there is now a character who shrinks when Mario looks at it, but when Mario turns away, it will grow large and menacing".

Boos appear as white, spherical, levitating ghosts, similar to the will-o'-the-wisp phenomenon or the Japanese Hitodama. They have faces featuring large fangs and long tongues, and three short extremities which resemble two arms and a tail. Being ghosts, Boos often appear in haunted house-themed levels in the games, in which they'll "sneak up" on the player, much in the fashion of ghosts of popular culture. Their presence can be recognized by their signature cackle. They are generally depicted as bashful and mischievous in nature.

Appearances

Mario series
Boos first appeared as "Boo Diddleys" (a pun on the name of American musician Bo Diddley) in 1988's Super Mario Bros. 3 for the NES, appearing in the more difficult fortress levels in which they pester Mario or Luigi by sneaking up on them. Since their first appearance, apart from their names being shortened simply to "Boos", their design or habits have not changed significantly, despite their appearances in most games since Super Mario Bros. 3. They have, however, spawned a number of subspecies over the years, with the first being the "Stretch" that also debuted Super Mario Bros. 3. Stretches are essentially Boos that are attached to platforms that will pop up to Mario or Luigi should they attempt to step on it.

Boos play a more prominent role in Super Mario World, in which they were the starring enemies in the game's many Ghost House levels. In these levels, Boos attack in groups and in a number of creative attack patterns, such as flying in wide circles in order to create obstacles for the player, or swarming in order to increase their attack radius. Super Mario World also introduced the "Fishin' Boo", a ghostly version of a Lakitu, as well as the secret boss "Big Boo", a larger and stronger Boo who would return as a boss throughout the series and even gain a subspecies of the same name. Super Mario World was also the first game to reveal that some Boos were able to transform into blocks, which, if lured into a suitable position, can be used to reach otherwise unreachable platforms. This trait later reappeared in Yoshi's Story of the Yoshi series and Super Mario Sunshine.

In Super Mario 64, an entire course was designed around the Boo character, titled "Big Boo's Haunt". In this game—unlike most preceding it—Boos could actually be killed by attacking them, by using moves such as a punch or ground pound. Staying true to the gameplay mechanic of previous games featuring Boo, if Mario looks away from Boo, it will attempt to move closer and attack Mario. However, if Mario retains eye contact with Boo, it will become translucent and impervious to attack.

In the 2001 GameCube launch title, Luigi's Mansion, the Boos were given the role of primary villains, alongside other miscellaneous ghosts of the mansion. The game's primary antagonist is King Boo, their king who leads the Boos of the mansion and who is responsible for trapping Mario inside a portrait. It was this game that established Luigi's fear of ghosts—particularly Boos—which would become a defining aspect of his timid and somewhat cowardly personality. To continue this theme, Boos began to target Luigi in future games, with King Boo in particular becoming Luigi's archenemy. For instance, they locked Luigi away in Super Mario 64 DS and trapped Luigi in a haunted mansion in Super Mario Galaxy. King Boo and his minions once again play a prominent role in its sequels.

In Super Mario Galaxy and Super Mario Galaxy 2, Mario and Luigi are able to transform into Boos themselves, through the use of the "Boo Mushroom" (a version of the series' famous Super Mushroom). In this form, the player is able to levitate and pass through certain walls, and being able to understand the Boos' language, "Booish".

Boos also make frequent appearances in the Mario spin-off games, sometimes as enemies or as part of the scenery, but sometimes as playable characters, the first instance of this being a playable Boo in Mario Tennis for the Nintendo 64. Starting in Mario Kart 64, Boos have appeared as items in some of the Mario Kart games, in which their purpose is to steal items from other racers and turn its user invisible for a short time. King Boo appeared as a playable racer in Mario Kart: Double Dash, Mario Kart Wii, Mario Kart 8 Deluxe, and Mario Kart Tour. Boos reappear in Super Mario 3D Land and New Super Mario Bros. 2, the latter of which introduces a new subspecies called the "Boohemoth".

The first appearance of a friendly Paper Boo who fought on Paper Mario's side was Lady Bow from the first Paper Mario game. Since then, later games, particularly the Paper Mario series (especially Mario & Luigi: Paper Jam), have presented other Paper Boos in a friendly and more positive light.

Since the release of Mario Party: Star Rush, a Boo amiibo figure (which glows in the dark) was released.

Yoshi series
Being the sister series of the Mario games, Boos also appear in similar roles throughout the Yoshi series, making their first appearance in the 1991 puzzle game, Yoshi (known as Yoshi's Egg in Japan and as Mario & Yoshi in Europe and Australia), in which they appeared alongside Goombas, Piranha Plants and Bloopers as "blocks" which must be stacked in order to hatch a sizable Yoshi. They also appear as opponents in 1992's Yoshi's Cookie, as well as appearing as enemies in the 1993 first-person shooter Yoshi's Safari.

Boos have also appeared in a number of forms in all of Yoshi'''s main platform games, starting with Super Mario World 2: Yoshi's Island in 1995, in which they appear as common enemies, as well as having a boss in the form of 'Bigger Boo'. In the Yoshi games, Boos mainly act in the same way as they do in the Mario games.

Other appearances
Outside of the games, Boos also appear in the Super Mario-kun comics. They also make an appearance in The Legend of Zelda: Link’s Awakening, along with several other Mario characters. Boo also appeared in the compilation video game Puzzle & Dragons Z + Super Mario Bros. Edition.

Reception

With Boo being one of the more popular Mario enemies, their image has been used in official Nintendo merchandise, such as plush dolls, as well as cookie cutters. IGN's Audrey Drake listed Boo as one of the best enemies in the Mario series while GameDaily ranked Boo seventh in a similar list, saying it is "unique" due to the fact that "Mario cannot kill with a Fire Flower or using one of his special suits." They also placed Boo fifth in a list of Nintendo characters that deserve their own games, calling it "Nintendo's favorite ghost". Boo was listed as the second best ghost in video game history by Joystick Division. In a reader-based poll, it placed on top of best ghost characters in a Nintendo game, receiving four times as many votes as the Pac-Man ghosts; King Boo also featured on the same list, placing eighth. Boo was also incorporated into a winning Comic-Con costume in 2019, when a cel-shaded cosplay of Mario took on a Borderlands 3 style, with the figure of Boo with glowing eyes locked in a cage on the cosplayer's back.

Celeste Monsour of geek culture website Fandomania published a list of ten of her favorite Boo-related arts and crafts created by fans for Halloween. The British Official Nintendo Magazine included the Boo Mushroom in their "Top 20 Mario Power-ups", ranking it at fourteenth, stating that it's "ruddy mint". Geekosystem also included the Boo Mushroom in their list of the "10 Greatest Mario Power-Ups", rating it 3rd in usefulness and 5th in whimsy, and 7th overall. Game Informer editor Tim Turi listed Big Boo among the top 10 ghosts, calling all Boos "timid, invulnerable nuisances", but calling out the "huge, screen filling" Big Boo in particular because of the need to trampoline over it in Super Mario World''. In 2013, ScrewAttack placed King Boo at number 2 in top ten Ghosts in video game history.

Notes

References

External links
Boo at Super Mario Wiki

Ghost characters in video games
Mario (franchise) characters
Mario (franchise) enemies
Video game characters introduced in 1988
Video game species and races